Astrid Gröpper  (born 12 April 1977) is a German women's former footballer. She was a member of the Germany women's national football team in 1996, playing 1 match. On club level she played for SV Kempten.

References

External links
 Profile at soccerdonna.de

1977 births
Living people
German women's footballers
Place of birth missing (living people)
Germany women's international footballers
Women's association football goalkeepers